Standard School District is a Kindergarten - 8th grade public school district in Oildale, California. The district has four schools, and serves the Northeast Bakersfield area.
The district is a feeder district to the Kern High School District.

References

External links
 

School districts in Kern County, California
School districts established in 1909
1909 establishments in California